Reginaldo Lopes de Jesus (born 22 February 1993), simply known as Reginaldo, is a Brazilian footballer who plays as a right back for CRB.

References

External links

1993 births
Living people
Sportspeople from Salvador, Bahia
Brazilian footballers
Association football defenders
Campeonato Brasileiro Série A players
Campeonato Brasileiro Série B players
Maringá Futebol Clube players
Coritiba Foot Ball Club players
ABC Futebol Clube players
Joinville Esporte Clube players
Oeste Futebol Clube players
Londrina Esporte Clube players
Clube Atlético Linense players
Club Athletico Paranaense players
Atlético Clube Goianiense players
Clube de Regatas Brasil players